Mohsen Al-Eisa [محسن العيسى in Arabic] (born 9 July 1987) is a Saudi footballer who plays for Muhayil as a winger.

Club career statistics

Honours

Al-Ahli
King Cup of Champions: 2012

References

1987 births
Living people
Saudi Arabian footballers
Al-Ansar FC (Medina) players
Al-Ahli Saudi FC players
Najran SC players
Al Batin FC players
Abha Club players
Al-Nojoom FC players
Ohod Club players
Muhayil Club players
Saudi First Division League players
Saudi Professional League players
Saudi Third Division players
Association football midfielders